Plainview-Rover High School was a high school in Plainview, Arkansas, serving grades 7–12. In its final years it was a part of the Two Rivers School District. It served the communities of Plainview and Rover.

History
It was previously a part of the Plainview-Rover School District. On July 1, 2004, that district consolidated into the Two Rivers district.

The K-12 Fourche Valley School closed in 2009, and its high school students were moved to Plainview-Rover High. Plainview-Rover High was closed in 2010 when it consolidated with Ola High School to form Two Rivers High School.

References

External links
 
 

Public high schools in Arkansas
Public middle schools in Arkansas
Defunct schools in Arkansas
Educational institutions disestablished in 2010
2010 disestablishments in Arkansas
Schools in Yell County, Arkansas